STS-61-C was the 24th mission of NASA's Space Shuttle program, and the seventh mission of Space Shuttle Columbia. It was the first time that Columbia, the first space-rated Space Shuttle orbiter to be constructed, had flown since STS-9. The mission launched from Florida's Kennedy Space Center on January 12, 1986, and landed six days later on January 18, 1986. STS-61-C's seven-person crew included the first Costa Rican-born astronaut, Franklin Chang-Díaz, and 2 future Administrators of NASA: the second African-American shuttle pilot, Charles Bolden, and the second sitting politician to fly in space, Representative Bill Nelson (D-FL). It was the last shuttle mission before the Space Shuttle Challenger disaster, which occurred ten days after STS-61-C's landing.

Crew

Backup crew

Crew seating arrangements

Mission background 
STS-61-C saw Columbia return to flight for the first time since the STS-9 mission in November 1983, after having undergone major modifications over the course of 18 months by Rockwell International in California. Most notable of these modifications was the addition of the SILTS (Shuttle Infrared Leeside Temperature Sensing) pod atop Columbia's vertical stabilizer, which used an infrared camera to observe reentry heating on the shuttle's left wing and part of its fuselage. The camera was only used for a few more missions after STS-61-C, but the pod remained on Columbia for the remainder of its operational life. Smaller and more discreet modifications were also added at various points throughout the shuttle. The bulky ejection seats, which had been disabled after STS-4, were replaced with conventional seats and head-up displays for the commander and pilot were installed.

The launch was originally scheduled for December 18, 1985, but the closeout of an aft orbiter compartment was delayed, and the mission was rescheduled for the following day. However, on December 19, 1985, the countdown was stopped at T-14 seconds due to an out-of-tolerance turbine reading on the right SRB's hydraulic system. Another launch attempt, on January 6, 1986, was terminated at T-31 seconds because of a problem in a valve in the liquid oxygen system. The countdown was recycled to T-20 minutes for a second launch attempt on the same day, but was held at T-9 minutes, and then scrubbed as the launch window expired. Another attempt was made on January 7, 1986, but was scrubbed because of bad weather at contingency landing sites at Dakar, Senegal, and Morón de la Frontera, Spain; yet another attempt, on January 9, 1986, was delayed because of a problem with a main engine prevalve, and on January 10, 1986, heavy rainfall in the launch area led to another scrub.

Mission summary 

After four unsuccessful launch attempts, Columbia launched successfully from Kennedy Space Center at 6:55:00 a.m. EST on January 12, 1986. There were no significant anomalies reported during the launch.

The primary objective of the mission was to deploy the Satcom-K1 communications satellite, second in a planned series of geosynchronous satellites owned and operated by RCA Americom; the deployment was successful. Columbia also carried a large number of small scientific experiments, including 13 Getaway Special (GAS) canisters devoted to investigations involving the effect of microgravity on materials processing, seed germination, chemical reactions, egg hatching, astronomy, atmospheric physics, and an experiment designed by Ellery Kurtz and Howard Wishnow to determine the effects of the space environment on fine arts materials and original oil paintings, flying four of Kurtz's paintings into space. It also carried the Materials Science Laboratory-2 structure for experiments involving liquid bubble suspension by sound waves, melting and resolidification of metallic samples and container-less melting and solidification of electrically conductive specimens. Another small experiment carrier located in the payload bay was the Hitchhiker G-1 (HHG-1), which carried three experiments to study film particles in the orbiter environment, test a new heat transfer system and determine the effects of contamination and atomic oxygen on ultraviolet optics materials, respectively. There were also four in-cabin experiments, three of them part of the Shuttle Student Involvement Program. The shuttle carried an experiment called the Comet Halley Active Monitoring Program (CHAMP), consisting of a  camera intended to photograph Halley's Comet through the aft flight deck overhead window. This experiment proved unsuccessful because of battery problems.

According to Bolden, in addition to deploying the RCA satellite, Cenker operated a classified experiment for the United States Air Force during the mission. Bolden was only told that it was a prototype for an infrared imaging camera.

STS-61-C was originally scheduled to last seven days, but NASA decided to end it after four because its delays had delayed the next flight, STS-51-L. It was rescheduled to land on January 17, 1986, but this was brought forward by one day. However, the landing attempt on January 16, 1986, was canceled because of unfavorable weather at Edwards Air Force Base. Continued bad weather forced another wave-off the following day. The flight was extended one more day to provide for a landing opportunity at Kennedy Space Center on January 18, 1986 – this was in order to avoid time lost in an Edwards Air Force Base landing and turnaround. However, bad weather at the KSC landing site resulted in yet another wave-off.

Columbia finally landed at Edwards Air Force Base on its fifth landing attempt at 5:59:51 a.m. PST, on January 18, 1986. The mission lasted a total of 6 days, 2 hours, 3 minutes, and 51 seconds. STS-61-C was the last successful Space Shuttle flight before the Challenger disaster, which occurred on January 28, 1986, only 10 days after Columbias return. Accordingly, commander Gibson later called the STS-61-C mission "The End of Innocence" for the Shuttle Program.

Nelson, the Florida congressman, had hoped to receive a Florida orange after landing in the state. The personnel at Edwards greeted the crew with what Bolden described as "a peck basket of California oranges and grapefruits".

Wake-up calls 
NASA began a tradition of playing music to astronauts during the Project Gemini, and first used music to wake up a flight crew during Apollo 15. Each track is specially chosen, often by the astronauts' families, and usually has a special meaning to an individual member of the crew, or is applicable to their daily activities.

Gag photo 

During the same session as the official crew photo, the NASA photographer took a gag photo of the STS-61-C crew with their heads and faces obscured by their helmets and visors.

See also 

 List of human spaceflights
 List of Space Shuttle missions
 Space Shuttle Columbia disaster

References

External links 
 NASA mission summary 
 STS-61C Video Highlights 

Space Shuttle missions
Edwards Air Force Base
1986 in California
1986 in Florida
Spacecraft launched in 1986
January 1986 events
Spacecraft which reentered in 1986